This is a list of cricketers who played first-class or List A cricket for Matara Sports Club. The side played at the top-level of Sri Lankan cricket between the 1997–98 season and 2001, although one match from 1990 is also classed as an official List A match.

The players listed are all those who are known to have played for the side in either first-class or List A cricket.

A
 Tharanga Abeysinghe

B
 Charitha Bandaratilleke
 Boduge Buddika

C
 Hewage Chaminda
 Visura Chinthaka

D
 P de Silva
 Nalin Dissanayake

F
 Farhath Farook
 Shihabdeen Faumi
 Upul Fernando

G
 Nalin Guruge

J
 PIW Jayasekera
 Asela Jayasinghe
 Tharanga Jayasinghe
 R Jothimuni

K
 Sathpath Kalum
 Chanaka Komasaru
 Sujith Kulatunga

L
 SW Lakshika
 Tharanga Lakshitha
 Gayal Lanka
 Ajantha Lankatilleke
 Imal Liyanage
 Isuru Lokuge

M
 S Manuratne
 Amila Mendis
 Romesh Mendis
 Suminda Mendis
 Tushara Munasinghe

N
 Wickramage Nadiranga
 Jagath Nandakumar
 Ravin Nirmal
 Pradeep Nishantha
 Prabath Nissanka

P
 Charith Palliyage
 Rasika Priyadarshana
 Iresh Priyantha

R
 Anushka Ramanayake
 C Ramanayake
 Mohamed Ramzan
 Pulasthi Rangana

S
 Primal Salgado
 Prabath Sanjeewa
 Atula Sedara
 Wasantha Shantha
 Priyantha Siriwardene
 Lasitha Suwandaratne

T
 Nandana Tharanga
 Heshan Tillakaratne

W
 Don Waidyaratne
 RB Weerappuli
 Nadeesh Wickramasekera

Notes

References

Matara Sports Club